Facundo Agustín Nadalin (born 19 August 1997) is an Argentine professional footballer who plays as a right-back for Atlético Rafaela, on loan from Newell's Old Boys.

Career
Newell's Old Boys signed Nadalín to their youth system in 2011 from Malvinas Argentinas. Six years later, in December 2017, he made his professional debut during a 2–2 draw against Racing Club on 2 December. Four further appearances followed in all competitions in his debut campaign of 2017–18, including a continental competition bow in the 2018 Copa Sudamericana versus Atlético Paranaense. After twenty-one games across 2018–19, Nadalin scored his first competitive goal in his second match of 2019–20 versus Unión Santa Fe on 17 August 2019.

On 5 August 2021, Nadalín was loaned out to Primera Nacional club Atlético de Rafaela until the end of 2022 with a purchase option.

Career statistics
.

References

External links

1997 births
Living people
Footballers from Rosario, Santa Fe
Argentine footballers
Association football defenders
Argentine Primera División players
Primera Nacional players
Newell's Old Boys footballers
Atlético de Rafaela footballers